Lectured Crawford (1842December 1901) was a teacher, A.M.E. Church minister, and state legislator in Georgia. He was one of the last African American legislators in Georgia prior to the prohibition on Black people holding office in the state. 

Crawford represented McIntosh County, Georgia. He contested an election outcome. He supported pensions for Georgia's Confederate soldiers.

He was one of several African Americans to represent the county in the Georgia House during and after Reconstruction.

See also
African-American officeholders during and following the Reconstruction era
List of African-American officeholders (1900-1959)

References

1842 births
1901 deaths
Members of the Georgia General Assembly

African-American state legislators in Georgia (U.S. state)
African-American men in politics